The 2020–21 SSV Jahn Regensburg season is the 114th season in the club's football history. This was the club's fourth consecutive season in the 2. Bundesliga, the second tier of German football, following promotion from the 3. Liga in 2016–17.

The club also competed in the 2020–21 edition of the DFB-Pokal.

Events
On 26 February 2021, coach Mersad Selimbegović tested positive for COVID-19. He was quarantined and Regensburg had to play the match against SC Paderborn 07 without their head coach. They won the match 1–0. Two days after, several more players were tested positive for COVID-19 and the whole team was quarantined for two weeks and the DFB-Pokal quarter-final match against SV Werder Bremen had to be postponed. The following league matches against VfL Osnabrück and SpVgg Greuther Fürth had to be postponed, too.

Transfers

In

Out

Pre-season and friendlies

2. Bundesliga

2. Bundesliga fixtures & results

League table

DFB-Pokal

Statistics
.

|}

References

External links
 

SSV Jahn Regensburg seasons
Jahn Regensburg